Bucaspor 1928 is a Turkish football club located in Buca, İzmir. The team competes in the TFF Second League.

History
Bucaspor 1928 was founded in 2011 as İzmir İl Özel İdarespor. Prior to the 2013-14 season it changed its name into Tire 1922 Spor. Cihan Aktaş acquired the shares of the club in 2019 and changed the club name in Buca Futbol Kulübü. However, this was not approved by the Turkish Football Association (TFF). Consequently the name Ci Group Buca was chosen. In February 2020 the club became 1928 Bucaspor before getting its current name Bucaspor 1928 as of May 2021. The club also gained the right to use the logo of Bucaspor.

League participations
TFF Second League: 2021–
TFF Third League: 2014–21
Turkish Regional Amateur League (BAL): 2012–2014
Turkish Amateur Football Leagues : 2011–2012

Stadium
Yeni Buca with 8,810 seats is the homeground of the club. Before relocating to Buca in 2019, the club played in Tire, İzmir at the Tire Arena Stadium, and previously the Tire 4 Eylül Stadium.

Current squad

Out on loan

References

External links 
Bucaspor 1928 on TFF.org

Football clubs in Turkey
Sports teams in İzmir
Association football clubs established in 1928
1928 establishments in Turkey